United Nations Security Council resolution 929, adopted on 22 June 1994, after recalling all resolutions on Rwanda, including 912 (1994), 918 (1994) and 925 (1994), the council authorised, under Chapter VII of the United Nations Charter, the temporary establishment of a multinational operation in the country to assist in humanitarian efforts and protect refugees and displaced people, until the full deployment of the expanded United Nations Assistance Mission for Rwanda (UNAMIR).

The security council called for the resumption of the political process under the Arusha Peace Agreement. It also anticipated the expansion of UNAMIR and stressed that it was solely a humanitarian force that would be impartial in nature. Concern was expressed at the continuation of the systematic and widespread killings of civilians in Rwanda to which the international community must respond.

It was agreed to establish a humanitarian operation headed by France until UNAMIR was at full strength. The operation intended to ensure the safety of displaced persons, refugees and civilians. It was limited to a period of two months following the adoption of the present resolution, and would be financed by the Member States participating themselves. Meanwhile, member states were urged to provide necessary support and to contribute to UNAMIR so that its mission could be expanded rapidly.

The Rwandan parties were urged to end the killings immediately. The Secretary-General Boutros Boutros-Ghali and the countries participating in the operation were requested to report on a regular basis to the council, with the first report due in 15 days. The secretary-general himself was required to report back on the expansion of UNAMIR and the resumption of the peace process.

Resolution 929 was adopted by 10 votes to none against, with five abstentions from Brazil, China, New Zealand, Nigeria and Pakistan.

See also
 History of Rwanda
 List of United Nations Security Council Resolutions 901 to 1000 (1994–1995)
 Rwandan Civil War
 Rwandan genocide
 United Nations Observer Mission Uganda–Rwanda

References

External links
 
Text of the Resolution at undocs.org

 0929
1994 in Rwanda
Rwandan genocide
 0929
June 1994 events